Trichophysetis drancesalis is a moth in the family Crambidae. It is found on Borneo.

References

Cybalomiinae
Moths described in 1858
Moths of Asia